The women's hammer throw event at the 2019 Summer Universiade was held on 10 and 12 July at the Stadio San Paolo in Naples.

Medalists

Results

Qualification
Qualification: 68.00 m (Q) or at least 12 best (q) qualified for the final.

Final

References

Hammer
2019